The 2015 Asia Pacific University Games was hosted in Cebu City, Philippines. The hosting university of the inaugural games will be the University of Cebu.

The Cebu Coliseum was the venue of the opening ceremony of the games and the men's basketball tournament, the Cebu Capitol Social Hall hosted Table tennis while badminton was played at Metro Sports in Salinas Drive.

Participants
Universities from three countries participated. Australia, South Korea, New Zealand, Papua New Guinea, and Chinese Taipei were to participate but withdrew from the competition.

Sports
 Badminton
 Basketball
 Table tennis

Results

Badminton
Participating Universities
 University of Cebu
 University of San Carlos
 Universiti Teknologi MARA

Basketball

|}

Table tennis

Medal table

Incomplete, results of the individual table tennis events are unknown.

References

Asia Pacific University Games
Asia Pacific University Games, 2015
Asia Pacific University Games
Sports in Cebu
Multi-sport events in the Philippines
December 2015 sports events in the Philippines